Andriy Yatsenko (born 14 September 1997) is a Ukrainian male freestyle wrestler. He won a silver medal in the 2016 European Wrestling Championships which was his first international senior success.

The next success was the victory in
XXI Outstanding Ukrainian Wrestlers and Coaches Memorial and bronze medal in U23 Senior European Championships.

2017 World Championship Bronze medalist.

2018 Was signed by Mumbai Maharathi team to the Pro Wrestling League - Season 3.

In March 2021, he competed at the European Qualification Tournament in Budapest, Hungary hoping to qualify for the 2020 Summer Olympics in Tokyo, Japan.

References

External links
 bio on unitedworldwrestling.org
 
 

Living people
1997 births
Ukrainian male sport wrestlers
World Wrestling Championships medalists
European Wrestling Championships medalists
Sportspeople from Kyiv